Bucksnort is an unincorporated community in Marshall County, Alabama, United States. A post office served the area near Bucksnort and operated under the name Keel from 1889 to 1907.

References

Unincorporated communities in Marshall County, Alabama
Unincorporated communities in Alabama